The Prison Ship Martyrs' Monument is a war memorial at Fort Greene Park, in the New York City borough of Brooklyn. It commemorates more than 11,500 American prisoners of war who died in captivity aboard sixteen British prison ships during the American Revolutionary War. The remains of a small fraction of those who died on the ships are interred in a crypt beneath its base. The ships included HMS Jersey, Scorpion, Hope, Falmouth, Stromboli, Hunter, and others.

Their remains were first gathered and interred in 1808. In 1867 landscape architects Frederick Law Olmsted and Calvert Vaux, designers of Central Park and Prospect Park, were engaged to prepare a new design for Washington Park as well as a new crypt for the remains of the prison ship martyrs. In 1873, after development near the Brooklyn Navy Yard uncovered the remains, they were moved and re-interred in a crypt beneath a small monument. Funds were raised for a larger monument, which was designed by noted architect Stanford White. Constructed of granite, its single Doric column  in height sits over the crypt at the top of a  33-step staircase. At the top of the column is an eight-ton bronze brazier, a funeral urn, by sculptor Adolph Weinman. President-elect William Howard Taft delivered the principal address when the monument was dedicated in 1908.

Context

Remains of deceased prisoners

During the Revolutionary War, the British maintained a series of prison ships in New York Harbor and jails on shore for prisoners of war. Due to a combination of neglect, poor conditions on the ships and disease, more Americans died on British prison ships moored in New York Harbor than in all the battles of the American Revolutionary War combined. The British disposed of the bodies of the dead from the jails and ships by quick interment or throwing the bodies overboard. Following the end of the war in 1783, the remains of those who died on the prison ships were neglected, left to lie along the Brooklyn shore on Wallabout Bay, a rural area little visited by New Yorkers. On January 21, 1877,  the New York Times reported that the dead came from all parts of the nation and "every state of the Union was represented among them."

Officials of the local Dutch Reformed Church met with resistance from the property owner when they sought to remove the bones to their churchyard. Nathaniel Scudder Prime reported on "skulls and feet, arms and legs sticking out of the crumbling bank in the wildest disorder". Edwin G. Burrows described the skulls on the coast "as thick as pumpkins in an autumn cornfield". During construction at the Naval Yards, workers were not sure what to do with the bones, and they started to fill casks and boxes. They were reburied on the grounds of the nearby John Jackson estate.

Eventually, "near twenty hogsheads full of bones were collected by the indefatigable industry of John Jackson, esq. the committee of Tammany Society, and other citizens, to be interred in the vault." The monument's dedication plaque estimates that 11,500 prisoners of war died in the prison ships, but others estimate the number to be as high as 18,000.

Political resolve
The movement to commemorate the dead only took off when political differences between Federalists and Democratic-Republicans deepened in the last years of the eighteenth century and the latter took up the question of a memorial in response to the Federalist erection of a statue of George Washington in 1803. The Tammany Society, headed by Benjamin Romaine was created and grew into a Republican organization. On February 10, 1803 Republican Congressman Samuel L. Mitchill asked the federal government to erect a monument to the fallen, but had no success They then turned their efforts to a grand ceremonial re-interment of the prisoners' remains, emphasizing less the construction of a monument than something more suited to the common man. Tammany formed the Wallabout Committee in January 1808. Their efforts took strength from renewed anti-British feeling stemming from British incidents in 1806 and 1807. Finally, when President Thomas Jefferson enacted the Embargo Act of 1808, Tammany and the Republicans used their plans for a re-interment as part of their campaign to bolster anti-British sentiment.

Precursor vaults and monuments

First vault and monument
On April 13, 1808, there was a ceremony to lay the cornerstone of a planned vault. A grand ceremony of re-interment followed on May 26, 1808. The state voted to provide the Tammany Society $1,000 to build a monument. The Society pocketed the money and the monument was never built. A small square building stood above the 1808 vault with an eagle mounted at the point of the roof.  It was located on a triangular plot of land near the Brooklyn Navy Yard waterfront (Wallabout Bay) in what is now called Vinegar Hill. A wooden fence with thirteen posts and bars painted with the names of the original thirteen states was erected in front. At the entrance through the fence, an inscription said: "Portal to the tomb of 11,500 patriot prisoners, who died in dungeons and prison-ships, in and about the City of New-York, during the Revolution." The remains were put in long coffins made of bluestone. Extra space was provided in case more bones were discovered during continuing renovations in the Brooklyn Navy Yard. Little was done to repair or maintain the vault and eventually the original monument was in a state of disrepair and neglect. In 1839, Benjamin Romaine purchased the land where the Martyrs were buried, in a tax sale from Henry Reed Stiles for $291.08. Later that year on July 4, 1839, Benjamin Romaine made an appeal for support (governmental or civic) to build a monument. In this appeal, Romaine talked about the monument and his intention to use his Revolutionary War pension for the monument. On January 31, 1844, Benjamin Romaine died and was also interred in the crypt as he had been a prisoner of war on the ships.

Second vault and monument
Later in the nineteenth century, the idea of erecting of a monument on the vault site attracted only occasional interest until 1873 when an appropriation of $6,500 was established for a new mausoleum. The new  brick mausoleum in Fort Greene Park, then known as Washington Park, was constructed. The new mausoleum was constructed of Portland granite embellished with pillars and fret work of polished Aberdeen stone. The front of the tomb had the following inscription: "SACRED TO THE MEMORY, OF OUR SAILORS, SOLDIERS AND CITIZENS, WHO SUFFERED AND DIED ON BOARD BRITISH PRISON SHIPS IN THE WALLABOUT DURING THE AMERICAN REVOLUTION". On June 18, 1873, the first tomb was emptied of bones and they were moved to this tomb. The bones remained here until interest was again built and a new monument could be constructed.

Current monument

Planning and construction
The Fort Greene chapter of the DAR was formed in 1896 in Brooklyn to foster the construction of a "suitable memorial to the memory of martyrs, civilian, military and naval, who perished in the noisome prison ships anchored in the Wallabout Bay during the Revolutionary War". The group quickly partnered with the Old Brooklynites to increase focus on the memorial.

Following the discovery of additional bones in the Brooklyn Naval Yard in 1899, interest in establishing a significant monument was again renewed. On June 16, 1900, the bones found during additional excavations in the Brooklyn Navy Yard were interred in the crypt with full military honors. On June 19, 1900, the Brooklyn Eagle reported that a committee had been appointed to build a larger memorial to replace the current one. Due to the work of this committee, funds for a new monument were finally considered and raised.

Funding for a larger monument came from all levels of government. On June 28, 1902, a joint resolution of the House and Senate appropriated $100,000 for the memorial construction under the provision that an additional $100,000 be raised from other sources. In the following months, New York State provided $25,000, and New York City $50,000, while private contributions provided another $25,000. Following funds being established, the Prison Ship Martyrs Association was incorporated in Albany on May 9, 1903 to oversee the work and the renowned architect Stanford White (1853–1906) of the architectural firm of McKim, Mead & White was commissioned to design it. The contract for construction of the monument was awarded to Carlin Construction Company under the project supervision of Lieut. Col. W. L. Marshall.
In 1776, Fort Greene Park was the site of Fort Putnam, one of a series of defenses built on the high land in Brooklyn. The construction was supervised by Colonel Rufus Putnam and the purpose was to protect New York from the British.

Dedication
The dedication ceremony on November 15, 1908, included a parade with 15,000 participants, including military and National Guard units, veterans, and civic organizations, including representatives of Tammany Hall Society in their first parade since the Civil War. President-elect William Howard Taft, Secretary of War Luke E. Wright, New York Governor Charles Evans Hughes, New Jersey Governor Franklin Fort, and Delaware Governor Preston Lea watched along with approximately twenty thousand spectators as "the enormous flag draping the Prison Ship Martyrs' Monument on the highest point of Fort Greene Park, Brooklyn, was allowed to slide slowly to the ground from its heighth  of 198 feet in the air". The ceremony was opened with a prayer delivered by Rev. S. Parkes Cadman, followed by a poem composed and read by the occasion's poet laureate Thomas Walsh. The principal address was delivered by Taft. He set out in detail the treatment of American prisoners and of the dead he said: "They died because of the cruelty of their immediate custodians and the neglect of those who, in higher authority, were responsible for their detention." He carefully described British culpability:

He discussed the treatment of prisoners of war throughout history and praised the recent Hague Convention on the rights of prisoners of war and the recent Sino-Japanese War in which "both parties exceeded, in the tenderness and the care which they gave to the prisoners of the other, the requirements of the Hague Convention".

Following the initial dedication, the Society of Old Brooklynites has hosted an annual memorial for the martyrs every year since President Taft dedicated the monument in 1908.

Neglect and restorations

20th century 
In February 1914, one of the eagles was stolen. The thieves sold it as scrap metal for $24. They broke the eagle from the granite base, rolled it down the slope and loaded it on a three-wheeled pushcart, leaving tracks which the police were able to follow. When police found it at a recycling yard, the wings of the eagle had already been removed and partially melted.

By 1921, the beacon was out. The twin helix stairways to the top of the monument, which visitors once paid a dime to climb, were closed. Until then, visitors could go to the top to get impressive views of Manhattan. In 1923, the bronze door to the crypt was "battered from its hinges" by vandals and the crypt was exposed. The New York Times report of the incident described how the monument provided a play area for neighborhood children: "[A] score of children, white and black, who live in the neighborhood were using the granite coping of the walls leading to the crypt as a sort of 'chute the chutes.' The color line was sharply drawn. The slope of one side was used by the negro children while the slope of the other side amused the whites. The children of neither hue were concerned with the crime. They realized vaguely that something unusual had taken place, but it was not important enough to them to stop their daily sport." However, neglect and damage to the park required it to be renovated. The memorial had become so scarred by vandals and unkempt from lack of proper maintenance as to present a dilapidated appearance. Work was done to clean and preserve the site. A staircase and elevator were installed inside the large column, and it was reopened in 1937 by Park Commissioner Robert Moses. Again, the park was neglected and restoration work was required. It began in 1948 to "keep the shrine from falling apart". The staircase and elevator, however, were both removed in 1949. In 1966, the eagles were removed and went missing until 1974.

In the ensuing years, however, the park slowly decayed again and, by the 1970s, graffiti covered much of the base of the monument and vandalism was taking its toll. After being vandalized repeatedly, the four eagles were removed for repairs in 1966 and restored when $251,000 was spent to repair the monument about 1974, part of a larger $780,000 restoration of Fort Greene Park. They were again removed in 1981 and two of them are on display at the Central Park Arsenal, the administrative headquarters of the New York City Parks Department. They presently flank the third floor entrance.

In 1995, an examination of the vault reported it held bone fragments in 20 slate boxes, each . During the park system's inspection in 1995, graffiti was noted to be on the crypt's interior walls. The graffiti is questionably dated to go back to 1973, 1908, and as one tag was scribbled, 1776 — which is anachronistic considering that this was before the tomb was even built, in 1908.

During a site review on January 7, 2000, Park System workers raised the lid of the stone coffin of Benjamin Romaine. The interior of the coffin appeared to have contained a partially collapsed wooden coffin. By then, the monument was missing plaques, the plaza was potholed, the crypt had a plywood door, and the eternal flame had long been extinguished.

21st century 
In December 2003, a dig was done on the original site of the Martyrs' Monument. The site dig was funded by a grant of $2,500 from the J. M. Kaplan Fund. It was supervised by Dr. Joan H. Geismar an archaeological consultant. The original site (block 44, lot 14 Brooklyn) is located on 89 Hudson Ave (formerly Jackson Street: named after an early donor of the property for the Monument in 1808). The goals of the dig were to review if any more human remains could be found on the site and if evidence of the original crypt remained. The site was scheduled for housing development to begin on the site. The Crypt location was specifically identified from an 1855 Perris insurance atlas as well as a mid-19th-century manuscript map found in the National Archives. The work determined that the site at one time contained a deep void, but no foundations were found. They did find a massive stone side wall as well as the likely original post holes for the rail fence. The site development was allowed with a recommendation of a plaque when work was done. The redevelopment of the site was completed and eventually the property changed owners. The status of the plaque is not known and currently there is no plaque on the site.

The city launched the renovation of the Prison Ship Monument with a $3.5 million budget in 2004. The scheduled repairs were plagued by cost overruns and the initial electrical contractor was fired by New York City and needed to be replaced. Additionally, a new spiral staircase was built inside the memorial. A budgetary study was conducted from March 6, 2006 to September 5, 2008 on electrical improvements and the cost estimated to about $341,000.

The restored monument was unveiled on November 15, 2008, a centennial celebration, at a rededication ceremony commissioned by the Fort Greene Park Conservancy to celebrate the centennial and re-dedication of the Fort Greene Park Prison Ship Martyrs' Monument. More than 500 people gathered to take part in the relighting of the flame to mark the 100th anniversary. That night, the column and urn were lit by a spectacular lighting scheme. The overall restoration cost for the monument from 2006 to 2008 was an estimated $5,100,000. However, in November 2009, it was noted that the light was again not working. The parks department worked to restore the lights and noted that although the lights were working correctly, there was a programming issue with the light timer. 

In April 2015, a group of anonymous vandals illicitly installed a 100-pound bust of Edward Snowden, the National Security Agency whistle blower, atop one of the four columns at the edge of the memorial. It was removed the same day by Parks Department personnel.

Description

Constructed of granite, the monument's single Doric column  in height sits over the crypt at the top of a  staircase with 99 steps. When it was built, it was the world's tallest Doric column. The column carries the inscription: "1776 THE PRISON SHIP MARTYRS MONUMENT 1908". The monument's column contained a staircase accessed by a bronze door. The grand staircase of 100  granite steps rises in three stages. At the foot of the staircase, the entrance to the vault was covered by a slab of brown sandstone, now in storage, that bears the names of the 1808 monument committee and builders, as well as this inscription:

At the top of the column are uprights  in diameter which are the shape of lion's heads. These hold up the urn. At the top of the column is an eight-ton bronze brazier or a funeral urn. The top of the urn is glazed with extra heavy plate glass. The inside of the urn contains the mechanics for the lighting. The top had a light, the "eternal flame". It went out in 1921 and was never relit until 1997 when a new solar-powered eternal beacon was turned on as part of a ceremony. The solar powered beacon or "eternal flame", now consists of solar powered lights reflected from a mirror. It is lit daily during the hours of darkness. Around the urn is a bronze railing also cast at Whale Creek Iron Works.

Four  open-winged  eagles stood at the corners of the  square terrace at the column's base, each on its own  pedestal in front of a  Doric column. They were designed by Adolf Weinman, who also designed the six-ton brazier that sits upon the monument's principal column.

The crypt is in a vault at the base of the stairs. Inside the vault the floor is made of concrete and the walls and ceiling are a bisque-colored brick. One enters the crypt through a copper-clad door. When entering it is three steps down and then a short passageway into the hill and at the end of the passage is the brick-lined crypt. The crypt is approximately  square. There are a series of slate coffins inserted into a double-set of shelves on the right and left. Various bones are said to be sorted by type into different coffins, presumably because individual bodies could not be identified and re-assembled for burial.

Additions
A plaque was added in 1960 located across from the front label on the monument. The plaque reads:

During the Bicentennial Year – 1976, King Juan Carlos of Spain dedicated a plaque honoring the 700 Spaniards who died on the prison ships.

Currently surrounding the monument are secured exhibits explaining the history of the prison ships, the Battle of Brooklyn and a list of the 8,000 known martyrs. It is not documented when these exhibits were added.

Near the monument, a small building designed to coordinate with the work of McKim, Mead, and White once provided restroom facilities but was re-purposed as a visitors' center for the park. The visitors center has pictorial exhibits plus displays of Revolutionary War weapons and uniform buttons that have been uncovered in the park over the years. It also houses a list of the 8,000 known prisoners on the ships copied from the records in the British War Department.

Maintenance and responsibility
In the first half of the 20th century efforts were made to seek a national designation. However, the U.S. Department of the Interior declined at the time and noted that the prisoners didn't die at the site itself. Currently, the New York City Department of Parks and Recreation is responsible for the preservation and supervision of the monument. A budgetary study was conducted from March 6, 2006, to September 5, 2008, on electrical improvements and the cost estimated at $341,000. The overall restoration cost for the monument from 2006 to 2008 was estimated at $5,100,000.

On April 11, 2013, U.S. Congressman Hakeem Jeffries introduced the Prison Ship Martyrs' Monument Preservation Act, which would have directed the Secretary of the Interior to study the suitability and feasibility of designating the Prison Ship Martyr's Monument as a unit of the National Park System. The study would look at what it would cost to run the park and how its proposed designation as a National Park would affect the surrounding area. The House voted on April 28, 2014 to pass the bill in a voice vote. The Department of the Interior supported the bill. The National Park Service said that "the monument commemorates the sacrifice over more than 11,000 patriots during the American Revolution." Rep. Yvette Clarke, who co-sponsored the bill, argued that the bill was a good idea because "this monument commemorates not only the sacrifices of soldiers in the Revolutionary War who dedicated themselves to the cause of liberty, but a reminder than even in wartime we must protect basic human rights. These thousands of deaths were an atrocity that should never occur again." Rep. Jeffries said that "as one of America's largest revolutionary war burial sites and in tribute to the patriots that lost their lives fighting for our nation's independence, this monument deserves to be considered as a unit of the National Park Service."

See also
 Prisoners in the American Revolutionary War
 List of British prison hulks

References
Notes

Bibliography
 Cray, Robert E., Jr.. "Commemorating the Prison Ship Dead: Revolutionary Memory and the Politics of Sepulture in the Early Republic, 1776–1808," Third series, vol. 56, no. 3, (July 1999)
 New York City Landmarks Preservation Commission. "Fort Greene Historic District Designation Report" (September 26, 1978)

External links

 New York Tribune of November 11, 1908 having engravings of the 1839 and 1867 tomb memorials
 Prison Ship Martyrs Association website
 Historical Marker Database: Prison Ship Martyrs Monument, additional images
 Mindful Walker: "In Our Midst: The Prison Ship Martyrs," September 30, 2010, additional images
 Prison Ship Martyrs Association, including additional images
 Photo gallery
 Prison Ship Monument memorials Find a grave website

American Revolutionary War monuments and memorials
American Revolutionary War prisoners of war held by Great Britain
American Revolutionary War sites
Buildings and structures in Brooklyn
New York City Designated Landmarks in Brooklyn
Outdoor sculptures in Brooklyn
Vandalized works of art in New York City
Monuments and memorials in Brooklyn
Monumental columns in the United States
New York (state) in the American Revolution
Martyrs' monuments and memorials
1908 sculptures
Buildings and structures completed in 1908
Stone sculptures in New York City
Fort Greene, Brooklyn
1908 establishments in New York City
Sculptures of birds in the United States
Works by Adolph Weinman